The men's 110 metres hurdles event at the 2006 World Junior Championships in Athletics was held in Beijing, China, at Chaoyang Sports Centre on 18, 19 and 20 August.  99.0 cm (3'3) (junior implement) hurdles were used.

Medalists

Results

Final
20 August
Wind: +1.5 m/s

Semifinals
19 August

Semifinal 1
Wind: -1.3 m/s

Semifinal 2
Wind: -1.4 m/s

Semifinal 3
Wind: -0.4 m/s

Heats
18 August

Heat 1
Wind: -0.5 m/s

Heat 2
Wind: +0.7 m/s

Heat 3
Wind: 0.0 m/s

Heat 4
Wind: +0.8 m/s

Heat 5
Wind: -0.2 m/s

Participation
According to an unofficial count, 40 athletes from 30 countries participated in the event.

References

110 metres hurdles
Sprint hurdles at the World Athletics U20 Championships